Wilfried Tevoedjre (born 20 September 1979 in Cotonou, Benin) is a Beninese swimmer specializing in freestyle. He competed in the 50 m event at the 2012 Summer Olympics and in the 50m event at the 2013 World Aquatics Championships.

References 

1979 births
Living people
Beninese male freestyle swimmers
Swimmers at the 2012 Summer Olympics
Olympic swimmers of Benin
People from Cotonou